Microsuchus is an extinct genus of mesoeucrocodylians, belonging to Notosuchia. Fossils have been found in the Bajo de la Carpa Formation, dating to the Santonian stage of the Late Cretaceous.

Classification 
Originally classified as a goniopholidid on the basis of the platycoelous vertebral centra, Microsuchus was recently redescribed and recovered as either a neosuchian or notosuchian. Diagnostic features include the presence of a bulge lateral to the prezygapophyses of the second sacral vertebra, elongated posterior zeugopodia, and proximal caudal centra with a triangular cross section. A 2017 cladistic analysis of Razanandrongobe further clarified the phylogenetic position of Microsuchus by recovering it as a primitive notosuchian.

References

External links 
 Microsuchus in the Paleobiology Database

Late Cretaceous crocodylomorphs of South America
Santonian life
Cretaceous Argentina
Fossils of Argentina
Bajo de la Carpa Formation
Fossil taxa described in 1928
Prehistoric pseudosuchian genera